Pecol may refer to:

 Pecöl, Hungary
Pecol, Italy, a frazione in Cortina d'Ampezzo, Veneto, Italy